Enumclaw is a city in King County, Washington, United States. The population was 12,543 at the 2020 census.

The Enumclaw Plateau, on which the city resides, was formed by a volcanic mudflow (lahar) from Mount Rainier approximately 5,700 years ago.

History
The name Enumclaw is derived from the Sahaptin word /inɨmɬá/, meaning "he who makes noise", from to /ínɨmn/, "to neigh, bray, sing", and /-ɬa/, "he who". According to legend the mountain's name was derived from an evil incident that occurred there, or to the occasional powerful windstorms from the east that affect the region. Native American mythology tells the story of two brothers – Enumclaw and Kapoonis – who were turned into thunder and lightning, respectively, by their father. The City of Enumclaw says the name means "thundering noise".

One of the first white settlers in south King County was Allen L. Porter. In 1853, he claimed a  parcel on the White River, about three miles (5 km) west of the site of Enumclaw. He maintained a troubled relationship with the local Smalkamish tribe (some of the ancestors of the Muckleshoot tribe) for some time, and in 1855 his cabin was burned to the ground. Porter, who had been warned in advance by a friend in the tribe, hid in the woods until they had left. After warning the settlers at Fort Steilacoom, he left the area, moving to Roy. He would never return to Enumclaw.

Enumclaw itself was homesteaded in 1879 by Frank and Mary Stevenson. In 1885, the Northern Pacific Railroad routed their transcontinental mainline through the site, accepting their offer of cleared, level land on which to build a siding. Confident that the area would grow, the Stevensons filed a plat with King County that same year. They built a hotel and gave away lots for a saloon and a general store.

At first the people called the town 'Stevensonville' after the founders, who soon refused the honor. One resident suggested 'Enumclaw,' which was the name of the strange sawed-off promontory north of town. The name's uniqueness gained favor with the locals.

On January 11, 1895, Mount Baldy, a small peak above the town, "erupted" with tremendous fire and smoke, although no losses or damage were reported, and the conflagration was minimized by residents. Throughout the 1880s and 1890s the area was farmed for hops. When the hops crop failed due to pests and economic downturn, the residents turned to dairy farming, which has been a mainstay ever since. The first census listing Enumclaw in 1900 put the population at 483 people.

In the 1890s, the Northern Pacific Railroad rerouted their line through Palmer, a few miles to the east of town. In 1910, the Chicago, Milwaukee, St. Paul and Pacific Railroad routed a branch line through Enumclaw.

The city was incorporated on January 27, 1913. In 1929, a much-anticipated route to Eastern Washington was opened across the Naches Pass Highway. In the 1950s Enumclaw Insurance Group greatly expanded its business and the home office became a major employer in the town.  The company is an insurer doing business in Washington, Oregon, Idaho and Utah.

In 2005 the Enumclaw horse sex case occurred on a farm five miles (8 km) northwest of Enumclaw towards Auburn, in unincorporated King County. A Boeing aerospace engineer named Kenneth Pinyan from Gig Harbor died after receiving anal sex from a horse at the farm. The case and the surrounding media attention, led to Washington State banning bestiality.

Geography

The city is located in the midst of flat, level farmlands and dairy farms in the east Puget Sound lowlands.  The flat geography in the middle of mountainous territory is due to the ancient Osceola Mudflow from nearby Mount Rainier.

The city is unique in the fact that it is landlocked by farm preservation on three sides and by protected forest lands to the east. The city is nestled against the Cascade foothills.

While Enumclaw is entirely located in King County, the city owns some park property within the boundaries of Pierce County.

Climate
This region experiences very warm (but not hot) and dry summers, with no average monthly temperatures above 71.6 °F (22 C) .  According to the Köppen Climate Classification system, Enumclaw has a warm-summer Mediterranean climate, abbreviated "Csb" on climate maps. Enumclaw typically runs about 5 degrees warmer than Seattle in the summer and 5 degrees colder than Seattle in the winter. The city of Enumclaw is generally above the fog while the area to the West of the city can see dense fog due to the proximity to the Green and White River as well as Lake Tapps. Snow is moderate with a typical year seeing about 6" to 8" total.

Economy
In contrast to other towns with big-box stores, Enumclaw has chosen a different path for its downtown that is filled with small local boutiques and non-chain restaurants and bistros.  Several companies, including Helac, Nor-Pac Seating, Nether Industries, and Hill AeroSystems, maintain major offices in the city. The remoteness of Enumclaw has made the picturesque, quintessential place to work from home and enjoy a bit of county life with all the convivences With the median home valued at $753,000, Enumclaw has gained many professionals, firefighters, police officers, downhill ski lovers as well as people who enjoy quick hiking access to Mt. Rainier.  Enumclaw has the most dairy farms in production (16 Grade "A") within the King and Pierce County region. Enumclaw has celebrated its close ties with its ag community and has many farm road stands as well as a Farmers Market that runs Spring through Fall. Many restaurants feature Farm to Fork food offerings.

Tourism
Enumclaw is the gateway to Mount Rainier National Park and the Crystal Mountain ski area. It is located along the Chinook Scenic Byway (SR 410), which provides seasonal access to the Yakima Valley and Eastern Washington. Enumclaw has four state parks in close proximity: Nolte, Flaming Geyser, Kanaskat Palmer, and Federation Forest. The Thunder Dome Car Museum chose Enumclaw as its location to build a major museum with vintage cars and paraphernalia. Enumclaw has become a basecamp for those wanting to ski at Crystal or hike Mt. Rainier during day and play at night. Enumclaw is well known for the King County Fair, Scottish Highland Games, AKC dog show (largest in the nation), Sundays on Cole festival every Sunday during the summer and the huge Sidewalk Street Fair the runs the third week in July. Enumclaw, in partnership with King County is just completing the last section of bike trail and a bridge that will connect Enumclaw to Puyallup with 23 miles of trail.

Crime
According to the FBI's latest crime report (2017 data, issued in 2018), out of 281 cities in Washington State, Enumclaw is the 18th safest city for violent and property crimes. The Enumclaw City Council has continued to make policing a priority by increasing the departments budget, focusing on training and equipment.

Demographics

In the year 2000, the center of population of Washington State was located in an unincorporated part of King County, just northeast of town.

2010 census
As of the census of 2010, there were 10,669 people, 4,420 households, and 2,793 families residing in the city. The racial makeup of the city was 91.8% White, 0.5% African American, 1.0% Native American, 0.9% Asian, 0.1% Pacific Islander, 2.9% from other races, and 2.7% from two or more races. Hispanic or Latino of any race were 6.6% of the population.

There were 4,420 households, of which 32.9% had children under the age of 18 living with them, 45.9% were married couples living together, 12.4% had a female householder with no husband present, 4.8% had a male householder with no wife present, and 36.8% were non-families. 30.8% of all households were made up of individuals, and 14% had someone living alone who was 65 years of age or older. The average household size was 2.39 and the average family size was 3.00.

The median age in the city was 38.9 years. 24.5% of residents were under the age of 18; 8.8% were between the ages of 18 and 24; 24.8% were from 25 to 44; 26.9% were from 45 to 64; and 14.9% were 65 years of age or older. The gender makeup of the city was 47.8% male and 52.2% female.

2000 census
As of the census of 2000, there were 11,116 people, 4,317 households, and 2,840 families residing in the city. The population density was 2,842.8 people per square mile (1,097.7/km2). There were 4,456 housing units at an average density of 1,139.6 per square mile (440.0/km2). The racial makeup of the city was 94.25% White, 0.79% Native American, 0.78% Asian, 0.30% African American, 0.11% Pacific Islander, 1.15% from other races, and 2.62% from two or more races. Hispanic or Latino of any race were 3.42% of the population. 16.6% were of German, 11.3% Irish, 10.3% English, 9.0% American, 7.6% Norwegian, and 5.9% Italian ancestry.

There were 4,317 households, out of which 37.5% had children under the age of 18 living with them, 50.0% were married couples living together, 11.2% had a female householder with no husband present, and 34.2% were non-families. 29.3% of all households were made up of individuals, and 14.0% had someone living alone who was 65 years of age or older. The average household size was 2.52 and the average family size was 3.13.

In the city, the population was spread out, with 29.2% under the age of 18, 7.6% from 18 to 24, 30.3% from 25 to 44, 18.3% from 45 to 64, and 14.5% who were 65 years of age or older. The median age was 35 years. For every 100 females, there were 91.5 males. For every 100 females age 18 and over, there were 85.3 males.

The median income for a household in the city was $58,019 in 2013. The average household income in the 98022 Enumclaw retail trade (draw) area was $89,481 in 2013. The per capita income for the city was $20,596. About 4.3% of families and 8.2% of the population were below the poverty line, including 6.3% of those under age 18 and 9.6% of those age 65 or over. Unemployment was at 4.30% in 2016 with 2313 blue collar workers and 4051 white collar workers.

Government

Enumclaw has a mayor–council government that is governed by a seven-member city council. The city councilmembers are elected at-large to four-year terms with no limits. The mayor is also elected to a four-year term with no limits. Former city couincilmember Jan Molinaro was elected mayor in 2017.

City council meetings are held on the second and fourth Mondays of each month at 7:00 p.m. in Council Chambers at City Hall. The agenda and Council packets are available online and at City Hall prior to the meeting.

Enumclaw is one of just three cities in Washington with breed-specific legislation limiting pit bull dogs within the city limits. Enumclaw has also chosen to ban the production, distribution and sale of recreational marijuana.

The City of Enumclaw operates its own solid waste utility (garbage), water, stormwater and sewer departments. The city is unique as it is just one of two cities in Washington State that owns its own natural gas utility.

The United States Postal Service operates the Enumclaw Post Office and a regional distribution center. Enumclaw is also home to a detachment for the Washington State Patrol (WSP), the U.S. Forest Service, the Department of Natural Resources and the Washington State Department of Transportation (WSDOT).

Media
The town is home to the Courier-Herald newspaper. Enumclaw is also home to KGRG (1330 AM), a 500 watt AM college radio station licensed to the Green River Foundation and operated by Green River Community College in Auburn.

Health care
Enumclaw's Virginia Mason St. Elizabeth Hospital, is part of the Catholic Health Initiatives (a seven-hospital organization based in Tacoma). The hospital was included on the 2011 list of the 25 "Most Wired" small and rural hospitals in the nation for its use of information technology to support quality patient care and achieve operational efficiencies. It replaced the former Enumclaw Community Hospital in 2011.

Parks and recreation
The Enumclaw Expo Center annually hosts the King County Fair and the Pacific Northwest Scottish Highland Games, among a number of other exhibitions and festivals. The Olympic Kennel Club has the 5th largest dog show in the nation each year in August. The 72-acre (29 ha) facility has many areas that are available to rent for weddings, trade shows, conventions and other special events.

Education
The Enumclaw School District operates public schools for students living in the Enumclaw, and other areas.

Elementary schools in Enumclaw and serving portions of Enumclaw include Black Diamond, Byron Kibler, Southwood, Sunrise, and Westwood. Some portions of Enumclaw are zoned to Enumclaw Middle School in Enumclaw, while some portions are zoned to Thunder Mountain Middle School in unincorporated King County. All residents of Enumclaw are zoned to Enumclaw High School. Green River Community College operates a campus in Enumclaw. Mike Nelson, former Superintendent of Enumclaw School District, won the 2018 State Superintendent of the Year Award.

Notable people

 Jeff Hougland, UFC fighter, Founder of Combat Sport and Fitness
 Kasey Kahne, NASCAR driver
 Richard Kovacevich, chairman of the board of directors of Wells Fargo & Company
 Swen Nater, retired Dutch professional basketball player, who won rebounding titles in both the ABA and NBA
 Brian Scalabrine, retired basketball player, formerly of the NBA's Boston Celtics and Chicago Bulls
 Tony Tost, poet and screenwriter
 Chase Hooper, UFC fighter. He is the youngest fighter to be signed by the promotion.

References

External links

 City of Enumclaw website
 Enumclaw Heritage

 
Cities in King County, Washington
Cities in Washington (state)
Populated places established in 1885
Cities in the Seattle metropolitan area
Washington placenames of Native American origin